Lancelot Speed (13 June 1860 – 31 December 1931) was a coastal painter and a British illustrator of books in the Victorian era, usually of a fantastical or romantic nature. He is probably most well known for his illustrations for Andrew Lang's fairy story books. Speed is credited as the designer of the 1916 silent film version of the novel She: A History of Adventure by H. Rider Haggard, which he illustrated.

Early life
Speed was born in London on 13 June 1860, the youngest son of William Speed, a Queen's Counsel of the Middle Temple. He attended Rugby School. He was admitted to Clare College, Cambridge, on 27 January 1881, matriculated that Easter, and was awarded a Bachelor of Arts degree in 1885.

Illustration
Speed had no formal art training, but became an illustrator working primarily in black and white. Process engraving particularly suited his fine lines, and he was one of the earlier illustrators to benefit from the new technology.

He lived and worked at Southend-on-Sea, England in the latter part of his life.

Films

He was also the director of several early British silent films.

 The Wonderful Adventures of Pip, Squeak and Wilfred series
 The Wonderful Adventures Of Pip, Squeak And Wilfred
 Pip And Wilfred Detectives
 Wilfred's Wonderful Adventures
 Over The Edge Of The World
 Popski's Early Life
 The Castaways
 The Six-Armed Image
 Trouble In The Nursery
 Ups And Downs
 Wilfred's Nightmare

Lancelot Speed's cartoon work is the source of the nickname for the colourful commander of the World War II Special Forces unit "Popski's Private Army". Lieutenant Colonel Vladimir Peniakoff, DSO MC, a Belgian of White Russian descent, was called "Popski" by Bill Kennedy Shaw, the Intelligence Officer of the Long Range Desert Group because his signallers had trouble with the spelling of his surname. Peniakoff earned early notoriety (and his MC) with his behind-the-lines raids to blow up German petrol dumps, transported there and back, in some exasperation, by the LRDG.

In the Pip, Squeak and Wilfred adventures before the start of World War II, there were two hairy characters: one was a scheming, plotting, bomb-throwing Bolshevik, and the other was his dog. The mad Russian was called "Professor Wtzkoffski" and the dog was called "Popski". These cartoon characters in the Daily Mirror were well known to all the soldiers, and in his best-selling book about his small irregular unit, "Popski" said, "...I was delighted with my nickname...".

Death
Speed died at Deal, Kent on 31 December 1931 and was buried at Knowlton, Kent, England. His estate was valued at just over £265.

Notes

References

External links

 
 
 

1860 births
1931 deaths
British children's book illustrators
British film directors
British illustrators
Alumni of Clare College, Cambridge